Lord Rose may refer to:

 Stuart Rose, Baron Rose of Monewden, British businessman
 Christopher Rose (judge) (Lord Justice Rose), British judge